The 1999–2000 English Premiership (known as the Allied Dunbar Premiership for sponsorship reasons) was the thirteenth full season of rugby union within the first tier of the English leagues, known as the Premiership.

The league was reduced from fourteen teams to twelve following London Scottish and Richmond both entering administration.

Participating teams and locations

Table
The season began on 10 September 1999.

Points increased from 2 to 3 for a win after the World Cup in November 1999. This was an attempt to ensure competitive balance in the leagues for teams while they were without their international players.

Results

Week 1

Week 2

Week 3

Week 4

Week 5

Week 6

Week 7

Week 8

Week 9

Week 10

Week 11

Week 12

Week 13

Week 14

Week 15

Week 16

Week 17

Week 18

Week 19

Week 20

Week 21

Week 22

Week 23

Week 24

Week 25

Leading scorers
Note: Flags to the left of player names indicate national team as has been defined under World Rugby eligibility rules, or primary nationality for players who did not earn international senior caps. Players may hold one or more non-WR nationalities.

Most points 
Source:

Most tries
Source:

Attendances

References

External links
 Official site

1999-2000
 
England